Ayni is the name of two locations in Tajikistan:

Ayni, Ayni District, the capital of Ayni District in Sughd Province
Ayni, Varzob District, a jamoat in Varzob District in Districts of Republican Subordination Province